UAAP Season 72 was the 2009–2010 season of the University Athletic Association of the Philippines. It was hosted by Far Eastern University, with opening rites on July 11, 2009 at the Araneta Coliseum. The men's basketball tournament and the women's volleyball tournament were aired by ABS-CBN's UHF Studio 23 for the tenth consecutive year.

Opening ceremonies
The opening ceremonies for the 72nd UAAP games was held at the Araneta Coliseum last July 11, 2009. The opening rites featured different student organizations from the host Far Eastern University including other participants from the other 7 UAAP member universities. With the season's theme One Color. One Goal. the event participants wore white costumes, symbolizing unity in the league, introduced the league member universities through flags and the sarimanok, bearing the member schools' respective colors.

Calendar changes
The schedule of the sporting events will be changed this season. Badminton will be held in the first semester, instead of chess.

Television coverage rights
With ABS-CBN's contract to broadcast the UAAP expiring on March 31, 2010, two other TV networks are bidding for exclusive television rights for the league, although ABS-CBN has the right of first refusal. Solar Entertainment Corporation's sports section Solar Sports will join the bidding for the TV rights, with a Solar official naming GMA Network as another interested party. The UAAP has been broadcast by ABS-CBN for ten years already at their UHF station Studio 23. UAAP president Anton Montinola said the league considers "to project the league not just nationally but also globally" due to "a lot of followers abroad, mostly alumni". Montinola further said the league has been satisfied with ABS-CBN's coverage of both the basketball and volleyball games. The volleyball tournament was even moved from the first semester (July–October) to the second semester (November–March) to maximize the TV coverage.

Confirming Solar's earlier revelation, GMA has joined the bidding, submitting theirs at a UAAP board meeting on March 19, 2009. In order to strengthen its position, ABS-CBN's bid includes airing the men's basketball championship series at their flagship VHF station Channel 2 instead of airing it on Studio 23, where ABS-CBN has aired the men's basketball tournament for the past nine seasons. Solar will air it on VHF C/S 9 of which they a block-timer. All three submitted five-year bids. GMA will air the games on its VHF channel Q.

Despite the TV rights row on the Pacquiao-Hatton boxing bout between ABS-CBN on one hand and Solar Sports and GMA on the other, Solar has confirmed it will stand by their UAAP bid, with Solar offering a possible linkage either to ABS-CBN's The Filipino Channel (on which the games currently air) or to GMA Pinoy TV to air the games internationally. With ABS-CBN's current contract worth P75 million, Montinola has expressed delight that "there are three TV networks that are very, very much interested to become our partner next season," noting that it is "the first time that this is happening." Montinola clarified that the UAAP is not "rushing things" to determine which among the three networks have the best offer, and declined to comment on the financial offers, saying, "We [UAAP, GMA 7, ABS-CBN and Solar] are still far from that discussion."

On October 4, right before the tip-off of Game 2 of the men's basketball finals, the UAAP and ABS-CBN agreed in principle and signed a memorandum of agreement giving the broadcasting network the right to air the league's games for another five-year period starting UAAP Season 73.

Basketball

The UAAP Season 72 basketball tournament began on July 11, 2009 at the Araneta Coliseum in Cubao, Quezon City. The tournament host was Far Eastern University and tournament commissioner was Jose "Joe" Lipa, Jr.

Men's tournament

The opening ceremonies and the opening day doubleheader were the first programs in the Philippines to be broadcast in high definition, although only SkyCable subscribers with HD boxes were able to watch them.

Elimination round

Team standings

Playoffs

Awards
 Most Valuable Player: 
 Rookie of the Year:

Women's tournament

Elimination round

Team standings

Playoffs

Awards
 Most Valuable Player: 
 Rookie of the Year:

Boys' tournament

Elimination round

Team standings

Playoffs

Awards
 Most Valuable Player: 
 Rookie of the Year:

Volleyball

Men's tournament

Elimination round

Team standings

Playoffs

Awards

 Finals Most Valuable Player: 
 Season Most Valuable Player: 
 Rookie of the Year:

Women's tournament

Elimination round

Team standings

Playoffs

Awards
 Finals Most Valuable Player: 
 Season Most Valuable Player: 
 Rookie of the Year:

Baseball

Men's tournament

Elimination round

Team standings

Playoffs

Awards
 Most Valuable Player:
 Rookie of the Year:
 Most Improved Player:

Taekwondo
The UAAP Season 72 taekwondo tournaments were held on September 16, 2009 at the University of Santo Tomas Gymnasium.

Men's tournament

Team standings

Awards
Most Valuable Player: 
Rookie of the Year:

Women's tournament

Team standings

Awards
Most Valuable Player: 
Rookie of the Year:

Boys' tournament

Team standings

Awards
Most Valuable Player: 
Rookie of the Year:

Badminton

Men's tournament

Elimination round

Team standings

Playoffs

Awards
 Most Valuable Player: 
 Rookie of the Year: 
 Most Improved Player:

Women's tournament

Elimination round

Team standings

Playoffs

Awards
 Most Valuable Player: 
 Rookie of the Year: 
 Most Improved Player:

Judo
The UAAP Judo Championships was held on October 4, 2009 hosted by the Ateneo de Manila University at the Blue Eagle Gym. It was a one-day tournament.

Men's tournament

Team standings

Awards
Most Valuable Player: 
Rookie of the Year:

Women's tournament

Team standings

Awards
Most Valuable Player: 
Rookie of the Year:

Boys' tournament

Team standings

Awards
Most Valuable Player: 
Rookie of the Year:

Track and field
The UAAP Track and Field Championships was held on February 7, 2010 at the Rizal Memorial Track and Football Stadium.

Men's tournament

Team standings

Awards
Most Valuable Player: 
Rookie of the Year:

Women's tournament

Team standings

Awards
Most Valuable Player: 
Rookie of the Year:

Boys' tournament

Team standings

Awards
Most Valuable Player: 
Rookie of the Year:

Chess
The UAAP Season 72 chess tournament started on January 10, 2010 at the Tan Yan Kee Student Center of the University of Santo Tomas. After fourteen rounds, the FEU Tamaraws came up on top, dominating both the Seniors Men and Women Tournaments. It could have scored a first ever triple championship in the UAAP Chess competition but its juniors team finished second to the Baby Falcons of Adamson.

Men's tournament

Team standings

Awards
Most Valuable Player: 
Rookie of the Year:

Women's tournament

Team standings

Awards
Most Valuable Player: 
Rookie of the Year:

Boys' tournament

Team standings

Awards
Most Valuable Player: 
Rookie of the Year:

Cheerdance
The UAAP Cheerdance Competition was held on September 13, 2009 at the Araneta Coliseum in Quezon City. The event was shown live on TV by Studio 23 and was hosted by Boom Gonzalez, Megan Young and the various UAAP courtside reporters. Cheer dance competition is an exhibition event. Points for the general championship are not awarded to the participants.

Host team in boldface. "Order" refers to order of performance.

General championship summary 
The general champion is determined by a point system. The system gives 15 points to the champion team of a UAAP event, 12 to the runner-up, and 10 to the third placer. The following points: 8, 6, 4, 2 and 1 are given to the rest of the participating teams according to their order of finish.

Medals table

Seniors' division

Juniors' division

General championship tally

Seniors' division

Juniors' division

Individual awards
Athlete of the Year:
Seniors: 
Juniors:

See also
NCAA Season 85

References

External links
ABS-CBN official website for the UAAP
UAAP men's basketball in Inboundpass.com
UAAP men's basketball in UBelt.com

 
2009 in Philippine sport
2009 in multi-sport events
72